Henry Huggins (15 March 1877 – 20 November 1942) was an English cricketer. He played for Gloucestershire between 1901 and 1921.

References

1877 births
1942 deaths
English cricketers
Gloucestershire cricketers
Cricketers from Oxford